Start Cycling Team is a Venezuelan UCI Continental cycling team established in 2012.

Team roster

Major wins
2013
 Time Trial Championships, Gustavo Miño
2014
 Time Trial Championships, Gustavo Miño
2018
Stage 10 Vuelta Ciclista a Venezuela, Orluis Aular

References

External links

Cycling teams established in 2012
2012 establishments in Paraguay
Cycling teams based in Paraguay
Cycling teams based in Serbia
Cycling teams based in Bolivia
Cycling teams based in Venezuela